Truth of Touch is the fourteenth studio album by keyboardist and composer Yanni, released by Yanni/Wake label in 2011.

Track listing

Production
Arranged by Yanni
Engineered by Yanni, Silvio Richetto & Travis Meck
Additional Arrangements by Miklos Malek on "Truth of Touch", "Seasons", "Voyage", "Flash of Color" and "Vertigo"
Additional Production by Marc Russell & David Scheuer on "Secret"
Mastered by Chris Bellman at Bernie Grundman Mastering, Los Angeles
Art Direction: & Design: Norman Moore, DesignArtLA.com
Photography: Silvio Richetto

(Production as described in CD liner notes.)

AllMusic Review
Truth of Touch was Yanni's first album of new studio material since 2003’s Ethnicity, with Yanni said to be "returning to his instrumental roots". In contrast to the vocal-centric of Yanni Voices (2009), Truth of Touch is a largely instrumental album, and was said to constitute a "return to form" for Yanni, referring to his mid-1990s musical style. The album was said to include cinematic elements, with smooth jazz and tribal rhythms.

Rankings
Peaked as #1 Billboard New Age album for 2011 and 2012 
Peaked as #11 Billboard Independent Album for 2011
Was the #1 top-selling New Age album of 2011 and #10 in 2012

References

External links
Official website

Interview, "Conversation with Yanni" (March 10, 2011), questions from various journalists (Webcite archive)

2011 albums
Yanni albums